Thomas de Morawitz Meczy (21 December 1922 – 22 July 2016) was a Spanish alpine skier. He competed in three events at the 1948 Winter Olympics.

Notes

References

External links
 
 
 
 

1922 births
2016 deaths
Spanish male alpine skiers
Olympic alpine skiers of Spain
Alpine skiers at the 1948 Winter Olympics
Sportspeople from Prague
20th-century Spanish people